Heliopsis anomala is a Mexican species of flowering plant in the family Asteraceae. It is native to northwestern Mexico in mountains and canyons near the Gulf of California. It has been found in both states of the Baja California Peninsula as well as in Sonora (including Isla Tiburón).

References

anomala
Flora of Northwestern Mexico
Plants described in 1933